Jhimma is an Indian Marathi language drama film directed by Hemant Dhome for Chalchitra Company. The film, written by Irawati Karnik and based on a story by Dhome, has an ensemble cast of Suhas Joshi, Nirmiti Sawant, Sonalee Kulkarni, Siddharth Chandekar, Kshitee Jog, Suchitra Bandekar, Mrinmayee Godbole and Sayali Sanjeev. The story of the film revolves around a group of seven women travelling to London, United Kingdom and discovering themselves. It was released theatrically on 19 November 2021, and it grossed  at the box office, and became the second highest grossing Marathi film of 2021

Synopsis 

Seven girls from different age groups and different socio-cultural backgrounds come together on a vacation with a tour company to London. During the course of this trip these women unfold their journey. This trip turns into an opportunity to mend fences, heal wounds, fall in love with themselves, combat their worst fears and celebrate life.

Cast  

 Siddharth Chandekar as Kabir Kulkarni
 Sonalee Kulkarni as Maithili Deshpande
 Suchitra Bandekar as Vaishali Deshpande
 Nirmiti Sawant as Nirmala Konde-Patil
 Kshitee Jog as Meeta Jahagirdar
 Suhas Joshi as Indumati Karnik (Indu)
 Sayali Sanjeev as Krutika Joshi
 Mrinmayee Godbole as Rama Lele-Shah
 Hemant Dhome as Nikhil (Maithili's fianceè turned husband)
 Anant Jog as Saheb (Nirmala's husband)
 Tyler Baylis as Steve (Krutika's London-based boyfriend turned husband)
 Nandini
 Chatrali Gupte as Meghna (Meeta's sister)
 Maithili Patwardhan as Chingu (Meeta's daughter)

Production
Principal photography of the film began on 9 July 2019. The London schedule of filming was wrapped in the end of July 2019. The dubbing of the film started on 24 June 2020. The release of the film was held up due to COVID-19 pandemic. In November 2020, the director Hemant Dhome, announced that the film will be released in theatres only.

Release
The film was scheduled to be theatrically released on 23 April 2021, but due to surge in COVID-19 pandemic the release was postponed. It was then released theatrically on 19 November 2021.

Home media

The satellite rights of the film were sold to Star Pravah and the film was made available on VOD on Amazon Prime Video.

Reception

Mihir Bhanage of Times of India rated the film with 4 stars out of 5 and praised the performance of ensemble, writing, "Each one delivers beautiful performances, but it is Suhas Joshi and Nirmitee Sawant who steal the show." Ending his review Bhanage stated, "You have one life and you should live it to the fullest. This is the point Jhimma drives home beautifully, making it a must-watch for everyone, especially amid the pandemic." In The Free Press Journal, Bobby Sing rated the film with three and a half stars and praised the performances of ensemble and music. Concluding the review Sing wrote, "watch it as a must and have a great evening with this entertaining family film in the present testing times."

Box Office
Jhimma collected  crore in first ten days of its opening.

 the film has grossed  crore.

Jhimma completed 100 days in cinemas with many records and the film has collected ₹14.07 crore.

Soundtrack 

The film's music was composed by Amitraj while lyrics written by Kshitij Patwardhan.

Accolades

Sequel
On 24 January 2023, a sequel of the film was announced titled as Jhimma 2. The sequel will be produced by Aanand L. Rai's Colour Yellow Productions and Chalchitra Mandalee and directed by Hemant Dhome on script of  Irawati Karnik. It is slated for release on Dussehra 2023. The jhimma 2 to go on floors

References

External links
 

2021 films
2020s Marathi-language films
2021 drama films
Indian drama films
Films shot in London
Films about vacationing
Films postponed due to the COVID-19 pandemic